Penev is a Bulgarian masculine surname, its feminine counterpart is Peneva. It may refer to
Dimitar Penev (born 1945), Bulgarian football player and coach, uncle of Luboslav
Luboslav Penev (born 1966), Bulgarian football player
Plamen Penev (disambiguation), several people
Veselin Penev (born 1982), Bulgarian football player
Yordan Penev (born 1988), Bulgarian football player

Bulgarian-language surnames